The European Language Resources Association (ELRA) is a not-for-profit organisation established under the law of the Grand Duchy of Luxembourg. Its seat is in Luxembourg and its headquarters is in Paris, France.

Activities
Since its founding in 1995, the European Language Resources Association has been a conduit for the distribution of speech, written, and terminology language resources (LRs) for human language technology (HLT), a key component of information society technologies (IST) In order to do so, a number of technical and logistic, commercial (prices, fees, royalties), legal (licensing, intellectual property rights, management), and information dissemination issues had to be addressed.

ELRA broadening its objectives and responsibilities towards the HLT community over the years, and is now also involved in the production, or commissioning of the production, of language resources through a number of initiatives, and actively committed to the evaluation of language-engineering tools as well as to the identification of new resources. The set up of the identification number system ISLRN, endorsed by NLP12 in 2013, is the most recent initiative led by ELDA to enhance the identification of language resources and their citation in publications.

Every other year, ELRA organizes a major conference, the International Language Resources and Evaluation Conference (LREC).

Mission
The mission of the Association is to promote language resources and evaluation for the Human Language Technology sector in all their forms and their uses, in a European context. Consequently, the goals are: to coordinate and carry out identification, production, validation, distribution, standardisation of languages resources, as well as support for evaluation of systems, products, tools, etc. Information Dissemination is also part of ELRA's missions which is carried through both the organisation of the conference LREC and the Language Resources and Evaluation Journal edited by Springer.

ELRA Board
Current members of the board of ELRA are:

Board officers
 President
 Henk van den Heuvel (The Netherlands)
 Vice-president
 Thierry Declerck (Germany)
 Secretary: Maria Gavrilidou (Greece)
 Treasurer: Tatjana Gornostaja (Latvia)
Board Members
 Gilles Adda (France)
 Nuria Bel (Spain)
 Antonio Branco (Portugal)
 Marko Grobelnik (Slovenia)
 Simonetta Montemagni (Italy)
 Honorary Presidents
 Nicoletta Calzolari (Italy)
 Joseph Mariani (France)
 ELRA Secretary General
 Khalid Choukri (France)

Antonio Zampolli Prize
The ELRA Board has created a prize to honour the memory of its first president, Professor Antonio Zampolli, a pioneer and visionary scientist who was internationally recognized in the field of computational linguistics and Human Language Technologies (HLT). He also contributed much through the establishment of ELRA and the LREC conference. 
To reflect Antonio Zampolli’s specific interest in our field, the Prize is awarded to individuals whose work lies within the areas of Language Resources and Language Technology Evaluation with acknowledged contributions to their advancement. So far, the Antonio Zampolli Prize was awarded to:

 Frederick Jelinek, from Johns Hopkins University, Baltimore (USA), at LREC 2004, in Lisbon.
 Christiane Fellbaum and George A. Miller, from Princeton University, Princeton (USA), at LREC 2006, in Genoa.
 Yorick Wilks, from the Oxford Internet Institute and the Computer Science Department of the University of Sheffield (UK), at LREC 2008, in Marrakech.
 Mark Liberman, from the University of Pennsylvania, Philadelphia (USA), at LREC 2010, in Valletta.
 Charles Fillmore and Collin F. Baker, from the International Computer Science Institute (ICSI), University of California Berkeley (USA) and Oriental Committee for the Co-Ordination and Standardisation of Speech Databases and Assessment Techniques (Oriental COCOSDA), at LREC 2012, in Istanbul.
 Alex Waibel from Carnegie Mellon University (USA) and Karlsruhe Institute of Technology (Germany), at LREC 2014, in Reykjavik. 
 Roger K. Moore from University of Sheffield (UK) at LREC 2016, in Portorož.
 Eva Hajičová from Charles University, Prague, (Czech Republic) at LREC 2018, in Miyazaki.

ELDA (Evaluations and Language Resources Distribution Agency)
To handle every issues related to the association affairs, ELDA, Evaluations & Language resources Distribution Agency, was created, as ELRA operational body. ELDA is responsible for the development and the execution of ELRA’s strategies and plans, and handles issues related to the distribution of language resources.

See also
LRE Map
Natural Language Processing
Speech Technology
Corpus Linguistics
Machine Translation
Linguistic Data Consortium - a US-based institute with a similar mission.
ISO/TC37
 JTC 1/SC 35 User interfaces
Language Grid - a platform for language resources, operated by NPO Language Grid Association.

References

External links
www.elra.info
www.elda.org
www.lrec-conf.org

Linguistics organizations
Organizations established in 1995
Organizations based in Paris
Non-profit organisations based in Luxembourg
Linguistic research institutes
Applied linguistics
Natural language processing